The P class, nominally described as "patrol boats", was in effect a class of British coastal sloops. Twenty-four ships to this design were ordered in May 1915 (numbered P.11 to P.34) and another thirty between February and June 1916 (numbered P.35 to P.64) under the Emergency War Programme for the Royal Navy in the First World War, although ten of the latter group were in December 1916 altered on the stocks before launch for use as decoy Q-ships and were renumbered as PC-class sloops. None were named initially, although in 1925 P.38 was given the name Spey.

These vessels were designed to replace destroyers in coastal operations, but had twin screws, a very low freeboard, ram bows of hardened steel, a sharply cutaway funnel and a small turning circle. Clearly seen as the linear descendants of the late 19th century steam torpedo boats and coastal destroyers, many were fitted with the 14-inch torpedo tubes removed from old torpedo boats.

With the survival of a builder's diary by William Bartram, full details of the sea trials of P.23 on 21 June 1916 exist. Bartram's commissioned a model from Sunderland modelmaker C Crawford & Sons and this model, in the collections of Sunderland Museum and Heritage Service, is stored in the model store of Tyne & Wear Archives & Museums Service at the Discovery Museum.

PC class sloops

Ten of these ships were completed as Q-ships, with their numbers being altered by the addition of a "C" after the "P". These were termed the PC class sloops. A further batch of ten ships were ordered in 1917 (PC.65 to PC.70 in January, and PC.71 to PC.74 in June) as PC class sloops. These were built to resemble small merchant vessels for use as decoy (Q) ships, and were alternatively known as "PQ" boats. Again, none were named, although in 1925 PC.73 was given the name Dart, while PC.55 and PC.69 were named Baluchi and Pathan respectively upon transfer to the Royal Indian Navy in May 1922.

The PC-class sloops were completed with slight enlargement from the standard P-class sloops. They were 247 ft (overall) long and 25½ ft in breadth, although they had similar machinery. Displacement varied from 682 tons in PC.42, PC.43, PC.44, PC.51, PC.55 and PC.56  to 694 tons in PC.60 to PC.63 and in PC.65 to PC.74. They carried one 4-inch and two 12-pounder guns, and no torpedo tubes.

Ships

References

 Dittmar, F. J. and J. J. Colledge. British Warships 1914–1919. Shepperton, Surrey, UK: Ian Allan, 1972. .
 Gardiner, Robert and Randal Gray. Conway's All The World's Fighting Ships 1906–1921. London: Conway Maritime Press, 1985. .

Further reading
 British and Empire Warships of the Second World War, H T Lenton, 1998, Greenhill Books,  
 Jane's Fighting Ships of World War I, Janes Publishing, 1919
 The Grand Fleet, Warship Design and Development 1906–1922, D. K. Brown, Chatham Publishing, 1999, 
 P boats of the First World War – William Bartram and P23 at Ian Whitehead's blog.
 Catalogue entry for TWCMS:B9633  P23 materials is at Collections – Tyne and Wear Archives & Museums then input TWCMS : B9663 .

External links
 

Ship classes of the Royal Navy
Sloop classes
Sloops of the Royal Navy
Sloops of the United Kingdom